Parapachycerina is a genus of small African flies of the family Lauxaniidae. They are mostly yellow-orange in colour.

Species
P. bispina  Davies & Miller, 2008
P. infuscata  Davies & Miller, 2008
P. lalitra  Davies & Miller, 2008
P. munroi Stuckenberg, 1971
P. talea  Davies & Miller, 2008

References

Lauxaniidae
Lauxanioidea genera
Diptera of Africa